Pithauria stramineipennis, the light straw ace, is a species of skipper butterfly found in tropical Asia.

Description
In describing this species James Wood-Mason and Lionel de Nicéville wrote:

Distribution
Found in Sikkim, Bhutan, Upper Assam and Cachar.

References

Astictopterini
Insects of Bhutan
Butterflies of Asia
Butterflies described in 1886
Taxa named by James Wood-Mason
Taxa named by Lionel de Nicéville